"Mary Jane's Last Dance" is a song written by Tom Petty and recorded by American rock band Tom Petty and the Heartbreakers. It was recorded while Petty was recording his Wildflowers album and was produced by Rick Rubin, guitarist Mike Campbell, and Petty. The sessions would prove to be the last to include drummer Stan Lynch before his eventual departure in 1994.  This song was first released as part of the Greatest Hits album in 1993. It rose to  14 on the US Billboard Hot 100, becoming Petty's first Billboard top-20 hit of the 1990s, and also topped the Billboard Album Rock Tracks chart for two weeks. Internationally, the song reached No. 2 in Portugal and No. 5 in Canada.

Content
Asked if the song was about drugs, Heartbreaker guitarist Mike Campbell said, "In the verse there is still the thing about an Indiana girl on an Indiana night, just when it gets to the chorus he had the presence of mind to give it a deeper meaning. My take on it is it can be whatever you want it to be. A lot of people think it's a drug reference, and if that's what you want to think, it very well could be, but it could also just be a goodbye love song." In the rest of the interview, Campbell said that the song was originally titled "Indiana Girl" and the first chorus began, "Hey, Indiana Girl, go out and find the world." He added that Petty "just couldn't get behind singing about 'hey, Indiana Girl,'" so he changed the chorus a week later.

Music video

The music video for the song features Petty as a morgue assistant who takes home a beautiful dead woman (played by Kim Basinger). He then acts as if she were alive, putting her in front of a television set and then dressing her as a bride, sitting her at the dinner table and dancing with her. A scene in the video featuring the dead woman wearing a wedding dress in a room full of wax candles is loosely based on a passage from the Charles Dickens novel Great Expectations. The plot also has similarities with the 1970 Charles Bukowski short story "The Copulating Mermaid of Venice, California", which had already inspired the 1987 Belgian film Crazy Love and the 1991 French film Cold Moon.

Later, Petty is shown carrying her to a rocky shore (a scene filmed at Leo Carrillo State Park in California) and gently releasing her into the sea. At the end of the video, Basinger, who is seen floating in the water, opens her eyes.

The video won the MTV Video Music Award for Best Male Video in 1994.

Plagiarism allegations 
In 2006, a US radio station claimed that Red Hot Chili Peppers hit single, "Dani California" had plagiarized "Mary Jane's Last Dance", even calling for Petty to sue the band. Longtime Petty and Chili Peppers producer Rick Rubin produced both songs. Petty responded by saying that he was not going to sue the Chili Peppers and felt that there was no negative intent and that a lot of rock and roll songs sound alike. The main riff in Petty's song, however, resembles the main riff in another song called "Waiting for the Sun" which was released in 1992 by The Jayhawks. The Jayhawks were the opening act for Petty's tour in 1992 and keyboardist Benmont Tench played on both "Waiting for the Sun" and "Mary Jane's Last Dance".

Personnel
 Tom Petty – vocals, guitars, harmonica
 Mike Campbell – electric guitar
 Howie Epstein – bass guitar, backing vocals
 Stan Lynch – drums
 Benmont Tench – keyboards

Charts

Weekly charts

Year-end charts

References

External links
 

Tom Petty songs
1993 singles
1993 songs
Fiction about necrophilia
MCA Records singles
MTV Video Music Award for Best Male Video
Music videos directed by Keir McFarlane
Song recordings produced by Rick Rubin
Songs about drugs
Songs about Indiana
Songs involved in plagiarism controversies